The 2019 FIA Motorsport Games GT Cup was the first FIA Motorsport Games GT Cup, continuation of the FIA GT Nations Cup held at ACI Vallelunga Circuit, Italy on 1 November to 3 November 2019. The race was contested with GT3-spec cars. Only Silver and Bronze drivers were allowed to compete. The event was part of the 2019 FIA Motorsport Games.

Entry list

Results

Qualifying 1

Qualifying 2

Qualifying Race 1

Qualifying Race 2

Main race

References

External links

GT Cup